The Thailand Graduate Institute of Science and Technology (TGIST) or in Thai "" established in 1998 by National Science and Technology Development Agency to develop expertise in science and technology and bridge the gap between industry and academia.

Partners
This is not a comprehensive list
 National Science and Technology Development Agency
 North Bangkok Cluster
 Thailand Science Park
 Asian Institute of Technology
 Sirindhorn International Institute of Technology
 Thammasat University, Rangsit Centre

External links
 

Institutes of higher education in Thailand
Engineering universities and colleges in Thailand
Educational institutions established in 1998
1998 establishments in Thailand
National Science and Technology Development Agency